The R213 road is a regional road in Ireland which links the N2 at Castleshane with the N12 near the border with Northern Ireland in County Monaghan.

See also 

 Roads in Ireland
 National primary road
 National secondary road

References 

Regional roads in the Republic of Ireland

Roads in County Monaghan